Arma Senkrah, (born Anna Loretta Harkness, 6 June 1864 – 3 September 1900) was an American violinist.

Training 
Anna Harkness was born in Williamson, New York. At age nine, her mother took her to study violin in Europe. From 1873-75 she studied with Arno Hilf in Leipzig and Wieniawski in Brussels. She was accepted at age eleven at the Conservatoire de Paris, where she studied with Lambert Massart and won a Guadagnini violin as first prize in 1881. This and her Stradivarius violin are now named after her. 
She embarked on a successful career as a solo violinist at age eighteen. Managed by the Hermann Wolff concert agency, she started performing in 1883 under the more exotic-sounding name of "Arma Senkrah," a palindrome of her real name. Performances included:

 25 November 1882, London at Crystal Palace, performing the Vieuxtemps d minor Violin Concerto.
 3 January 1884, Leipzig, at the Gewandhaus.
 30 September 1884, Berlin Philharmonic Orchestra, performing the Vieuxtemps d minor.
 18 December 1885, Frankfurt Museum Concert, performing the Mendelssohn Violin Concerto.

In 1885 she became part of the circle around Franz Liszt in the last year of his life and settled in Weimar.
In 1886 she gave concerts in Moscow and met Tchaikovsky. Her performance with the Berlin Philharmonic on 4 October 1886 included his Serenade Melancholique. 
One of her last concerts was in Frankfurt, on 17 February 1888, where she played the g minor Violin Concerto by Max Bruch.

After many successful appearances across Europe, she married a Weimar lawyer in 1888 and stopped performing. In 1900, she committed suicide.

Biography 
Born in Williamson, New York, on 6 June 1864, Anna Loretta Harkness was introduced to the violin by her mother. When she was nine, she went to Europe where she studied under Arno Hilf in Leipzig and Henryk Wieniawski in Brussels. In 1875 she entered the Paris Conservatoire to study under Joseph Lambert Massart. She received a Guadagini violin inscribed with her name as the Conservoire's first prize in 1881 when she was just 17.

Thereafter she toured throughout Europe, performing at London's Crystal Palace in 1882, in Leipzig in 1883 and in Berlin in 1884. It was around this time that on the advice of her agent she changed her name to Senkrah (Harkness written backwards, omitting the second 's'). In 1885, she performed with Franz Liszt and associated with his pupils. When in Russia in 1886, she met Tchaikovsky.

On 3 September 1900, after two years of marriage to a Weimar lawyer by the name of Hoffmann, she shot herself with a revolver, possibly as a result of a brain disorder.

References

Bibliography 
Silke Wenzel, "Arma Senkrah," MUGI--Musik und Gender im Internet, accessed 23.12.2022 https://mugi.hfmt-hamburg.de/receive/mugi_person_00000764

1864 births
1900 suicides
19th-century classical violinists
American classical violinists
Women classical violinists
Musicians from Rochester, New York
Conservatoire de Paris alumni
Suicides by firearm in Germany